Stand United F.C. is a professional football club based in the city of Shinyanga, Shinyanga Region, Tanzania. They compete in the Tanzanian Premier League, the highest tier of league football in Tanzania.

Home games are being played at Kambarage Stadium in Shinyanga, which is an all-seater stadium.

External links
 https://www.facebook.com/STAND-United-FC-502365473196354/timeline/ [Facebook Site]

References

Football clubs in Tanzania
Shinyanga Region